Vogel Motorsport is a Brazilian auto racing team based in Petropolis, Rio de Janeiro.

External links
  

Stock Car Brasil teams
Auto racing teams established in 2000
Brazilian auto racing teams